Richmond is a suburb of Mackay in the Mackay Region, Queensland, Australia. In the  Richmond had a population of 486 people.

Geography
Although officially gazetted as a suburb, most of the land use in Richmond is agricultural, predominantly growing sugarcane. A network of cane tramways in the suburb transfers the harvested sugarcane to the sugar mill for processing.

History
Nindaroo Provisional School opened on 27 February 1899. On 1 January 1909 it became Nindaroo State School It closed in 1963. The school was located at 1 Boveys Road, corner of Mackay Habana Road, now in Richmond.

In the 2011 census, Richmond had a population of 505 people.

In the  Richmond had a population of 486 people.

Heritage listings 
Richmond has a number of heritage-listed sites, including:
 Habana Road: Richmond Mill Ruins

Education 
There are no schools in Richmond. The nearest government primary schools are Beaconsfield State School in neighbouring Beaconsfield to the east, Eimeo Road State School in neighbouring Rural View to the north-east, and Northview State School in neighbouring Mount Pleasant to the south-east. The nearest government secondary schools are Mackay Northern Beaches State High School in neighbouring Rural View to the north-east, Pioneer State High School in Andergrove to the east, and Mackay North State High School in North Mackay.

See also 
 List of tramways in Queensland

References

Suburbs of Mackay, Queensland